Ahmet Hamdi Boyacıoğlu (1920, Bolu – August 23, 1998) was a Turkish judge. He was president of the Constitutional Court of Turkey from August 9, 1982, until April 6, 1985.

References

External links
Web-site of the Constitutional Court of Turkey 

Turkish judges
Turkish civil servants
1920 births
1998 deaths
Presidents of the Constitutional Court of Turkey
Members of the Council of State (Turkey)